On February 22, 2010, three Sikh men were said to have been beheaded by Taliban groups in the FATA region of Pakistan and their heads sent to a gurudwara in Peshawar, with one of them identified as Jaspal Singh. A Press Trust of India report later quoted sources as saying there was confusion on the exact numbers. It said that two men were beheaded, with bodies of Jaspal found in Khyber Agency and Mahal Singh in Orakzai Agency, while others were being held hostage. Pakistani officials maintained only Jaspal's body was found.

In 2009, Taliban had imposed "jizya" on the community numbering 10,000 in Khyber Pakhtunkhwa and the tribal belt, resulting in many fleeing to other Pakistani cities. The group demanded Rs. 30 million for the release of the abducted Sikhs. According to sources, two of the kidnapped Sikhs were killed after their relatives failed to pay the ransom. Two Sikhs, Sukhjeet Singh and Gurvinder Singh, were later rescued by Pakistani security forces.

It was feared that the incident would adversely affect talks between India and Pakistan scheduled for 25 February. The men had gone to the tribal areas for work but were held by Taliban groups who apparently asked them to convert to Islam. The men resisted the conversion and were then beheaded. Indian government sources stated that their heads were thrown in a common area to create fear in the community. India condemned the incident with its 
External Affairs Minister S. M. Krishna stating that it would figure in the talks.

References

Terrorist incidents in Pakistan in 2010
Persecution of Sikhs
Sikhism in Pakistan
People killed by the Tehrik-i-Taliban Pakistan
Persecution by Muslims
People executed for refusing to convert to Islam
Crime in Khyber Pakhtunkhwa
History of Khyber Pakhtunkhwa
February 2010 events in Pakistan
2010 murders in Pakistan